Justiciar is the English form of the medieval Latin term justiciarius or justitiarius ("man of justice", i.e. judge). During the Middle Ages in England, the Chief Justiciar (later known simply as the Justiciar) was roughly equivalent to a modern Prime Minister of the United Kingdom, as the monarch's chief minister. Similar positions existed in continental Europe, particularly in Norman Italy and in the Carolingian Empire.

A similar office was formed in Scotland, although there were usually two or three – the Justiciar of Scotia, the Justiciar of Lothian and, in the 13th century, the Justiciar of Galloway. These offices later evolved into a national one called Lord Justice-General. The modern title is Lord President of the Court of Session.

The Justiciar of Ireland was an office established during the Anglo-Norman invasion of Ireland and was a key tool in its colonisation. Following the conquest of the Principality of Wales in the 13th century, the areas that became personal fiefs of the English monarchs were placed under the control of the Justiciar of North Wales and the Justiciar of South Wales.

England
In the Kingdom of England, the term "justiciar" originally referred to any officer of the King's Court (Curia Regis) or, indeed, anyone who possessed a law court of his own or was qualified to act as a judge in the shire-courts. In each English shire, the sheriff was the king's representative in all matters. The only appeal against decisions of the sheriff or his courts was to the king. During the reign of William Rufus, many sheriffs were severely overworked; Rufus eased the burden by appointing local justiciars in some shires.

The Norman kings were often overseas and appointed a justiciar, regent or lieutenant to represent them in the kingdom, as the sheriff did in the shire. Later, this post became known as the Chief Justiciar (or royal capital justiciar), although the titles were not generally used contemporaneously. Some historians claim the first in the post was Roger of Salisbury; Frank Barlow argues in favour of Bishop Ranulf Flambard, a functionary within the household of William I of England, as the first, and points out that the role began, perhaps, with Odo of Bayeux in his relationship with William I. However, Flambard was not a chief justiciar but was probably the first to exercise the powers of a justiciar. It was not until the reign of Henry II that the title was exclusively applied to the king's chief minister.

The chief justiciar was invariably a great noble or churchman, and the office became very powerful and important; enough to be a threat to the king. The last great justiciar, Hubert de Burgh, 1st Earl of Kent, was removed from office in 1232, and the chancellor soon took the position formerly occupied by the chief justiciar as second to the king in dignity, as well as in power and influence. Under King Edward I, the office of justiciar was replaced by separate heads for the three branches into which the King's Court was divided – justices of the Court of Common Pleas, justices of the Court of King's Bench, and barons of the Court of Exchequer.

List of (chief) justiciars of England

Source:

Scotland

In Scotland, justiciars were the king's lieutenants for judicial and administrative purposes. The office was established in the 12th century, either by Alexander I or by his successor, David I. The title of 'Justiciar' was reserved for two or three high officials, the chief one—the Justiciar of Scotia—having his jurisdiction to the north of the River Forth. The Justiciar of Lothian dealt with the part of the kingdom south of the Forth-Clyde line. The role of justiciar evolved into the current Lord Justice-General, the head of the High Court of Justiciary, head of the judiciary in Scotland, and a member of the Royal Household. 
The Duke of Argyll still holds the hereditary title of High Justiciar of Argyll, but no responsibilities now attach to it.

Wales

Following Edward I of England's conquest of the Principality of Wales (1277–1283), the Statute of Rhuddlan established the governance of the areas of Wales under direct royal control. The new counties of Anglesey, Caernarfonshire and Merioneth were administered on behalf of the king by the Justiciar of North Wales, while Carmarthenshire and Cardiganshire were placed under the control of the Justiciar of South Wales.

Ireland

The title justiciar or chief justiciar was commonly borne by the chief governor of Ireland in the centuries after the Norman invasion of Ireland. By the fifteenth century the chief governor was usually styled the King's Lieutenant, with the justiciar a subordinate role that evolved into the Lords Justices of Ireland.

Other jurisdictions

The title Justiciar was given by Henry II of England to the Seneschal of Normandy.

In the 12th century, a magister justitiarius appeared in the Norman kingdom of Sicily, presiding over the Royal Court (Magna Curia), empowered, with his assistants, to decide, inter alia, all cases reserved to the Crown. There is no clear evidence that this title and office were borrowed from England; it was probably based on a Norman practice instituted in both realms. In the 13th century the office of justiciar was instituted in several principal localities around Sicily.

In medieval Sweden, the lagman ("lawspeaker") was the judge, or person learned in law, for a province, an area with several local district courts. Since the position corresponds to the general meaning of "justiciar", "justiciar" is often used to translate "lagman" in English texts. Lagmän (plural) were generally also members of the Senate of the realm, an institution corresponding to the English Privy Council. Finally, the Swedish term "riksdrots" is often translated as "Lord High Justiciar of Sweden".

Notes

External links

 William Stubbs, Constitutional History of England
 Du Cange, Glossarium (Niort, f885) s.v. Justitiarius (in Latin).

Politics in medieval Scotland
 
Scots law formal titles
Historical legal occupations
Legal history of Scotland
Medieval English law
Political history of medieval England